Sveti Nikola Island (lit. "Island of Saint Nicholas") is an island in the Adriatic Sea, in the Montenegrin municipality of Budva.

Description
Sveti Nikola island is located opposite to the town of Budva,  from Budva's old town.

The island is a popular excursion site in the Budva area.

Deer inhabit the uncultivated part of the island. The island is called Školj by locals, which comes from Italian scoglio or from Venetian scogio meaning islet or reef.

See also
Budva Riviera

References

Islands of Montenegro
Islands of the Adriatic Sea
Tourism in Montenegro
Budva